Gyula Kajner is a Hungarian sprint canoer who competed from the early 1990s to the early 2000s. He won five medals at the ICF Canoe Sprint World Championships with four golds (K-4 200 m: 1995, 1998, 1999, 2001) and a bronze (K-4 500 m: 1990).

References

Hungarian male canoeists
Living people
Year of birth missing (living people)
ICF Canoe Sprint World Championships medalists in kayak